Donald Joe Booher (February 22, 1941 – February 12, 1993) was a NASCAR Winston Cup Series and Goody's Dash driver. He spent his time running a farming business when he was not racing. He was killed while competing in the 1993 Goody's Dash Cup season-opening Florida 200 at the Daytona International Speedway in Daytona Beach, Florida.

Prior to 1993, he had made 21 career starts in NASCAR's Winston Cup Series. He also competed in the ARCA stock car series.

On February 12, 1993, Booher was competing in the Florida 200, the season opener of the NASCAR Goody's Dash Series for 4-cylinder compact cars. Running in mid-field during the second lap of the race, Booher's Chevrolet Beretta clipped the left front quarter panel of Carl Horton's Pontiac and went out of control. He then tagged the wall and was hit in the right front by Rodney White. The accident caused a brief red flag period before the race was restarted. White was in critical condition after suffering compression fractures of his vertebrae and was taken to Halifax Medical Center, but he survived and was not paralyzed. Horton was not hurt in the accident. After being taken to the same hospital, the 51-year-old Booher died of massive head and internal injuries.

Motorsports career results

NASCAR
(key) (Bold – Pole position awarded by qualifying time. Italics – Pole position earned by points standings or practice time. * – Most laps led.)

Winston Cup Series

Daytona 500

ARCA SuperCar Series
(key) (Bold – Pole position awarded by qualifying time. Italics – Pole position earned by points standings or practice time. * – Most laps led.)

References

External links
Statistics

1941 births
1993 deaths
ARCA Menards Series drivers
Filmed deaths in motorsport
Filmed deaths in the United States
NASCAR drivers
Racing drivers from Indiana
Racing drivers who died while racing
Sports deaths in Florida